Rose Hill Township may refer to:

 Rose Hill Township, Cottonwood County, Minnesota
 Rose Hill Township, Johnson County, Missouri
 Rose Hill Township, Duplin County, North Carolina, in Duplin County, North Carolina
 Rose Hill Township, Foster County, North Dakota, in Foster County, North Dakota
 Rose Hill Township, McHenry County, North Dakota, in McHenry County, North Dakota
 Rose Hill Township, Hand County, South Dakota, in Hand County, South Dakota

Township name disambiguation pages